Cardozo Education Campus, formerly Cardozo Senior High School and Central High School, is a combined middle and high school at 13th and Clifton Street in northwest Washington, D.C., United States, in the Columbia Heights neighborhood. Cardozo is operated by District of Columbia Public Schools. The school is named after clergyman, politician, and educator Francis Lewis Cardozo.

Central High School
The Advanced Grammar School for Boys was established in 1877 and then combined with a similar school for girls in 1882 to form Washington High School, the first high school in the city. In 1890, the High School was split into three, with one high school opened in the current Peabody Elementary School building on Capitol Hill and another in Georgetown in the Curtis Building. As a result, the Washington High School became known as Central High School. In 1916, the school moved from Seventh and O to Thirteenth and Clifton.

Known locally as "the castle on the hill", Cardozo's iconic building was designed by architect William B. Ittner, a nationally renowned school building architect. The building was dedicated on February 15, 1917.

Cardozo Senior High School 
Cardozo Senior High School was established in 1928. Originally located at Rhode Island Avenue and Ninth Street NW, it relocated to the Central High School building in 1950 and renamed. Cardozo was assigned for "colored" students in the segregated system and became one of three black high schools in DC.

The U Street Metro station is partially named after this school, with "Cardozo" in the station's subtitle. Likewise, an alternative, Urban Renewal-era name for the Columbia Heights neighborhood is Upper Cardozo, and some of the public buildings in the area still bear this name.

Until the 1954 opening of the all-black Luther Jackson High School in Fairfax County, Virginia, Cardozo and several other DCPS schools, along with a school in Manassas, Virginia, enrolled black secondary school students from the Fairfax County Public Schools as that district did not yet operate secondary schools for blacks.

During the 1970s and 1980s, Cardozo High School's marching band was one of the best in Washington, DC, and won several band competitions.  The band was invited to participate in the Rose Parade in 1981.

Renovation
In December 2011, work began to completely renovate Cardozo from the inside-out. Everything from exterior facade's crumbling masonry and shoddy window panes to the interior's dark, dingy hallways and outdated classroom spaces were replaced or restored to their original glory. Technology was added to classrooms, wood floors throughout the building were refinished, and the two courtyard spaces in the center of the school were turned into enclosed atrium spaces with the addition of glass skylights. The athletic facilities were improved and expanded as well, with a regulation-size gymnasium added onto the west side of the building. The swimming pool was also restored. In all, the renovation cost approximately $130 million and the school reopened for a new school year in August 2013. In addition to the physical changes to the building itself, the student body was increased with the addition of middle school students from the now-closed Shaw Middle School and the campus was renamed as Cardozo Education Campus.

Shootings
Four different shootings happened on the school campus: the first on January 23, 1969 (1 dead, no injuries); the second on January 6, 1995 (1 dead, no injuries); the third on April 2, 2003 (1 injured, no deaths); and the fourth on September 22, 2006 (1 injured, no deaths).

In popular culture

The video for the Don't Copy That Floppy anti-software piracy campaign was shot at Cardozo.

The school appears in Wale's "Chillin" music video.

The school's marching band appears in the parade at the end of the movie, D.C. Cab.

Notable alumni
Central High School
Beatrice Aitchison, mathematician
Caleb T. Bailey, United States Marine Corps brigadier general
Sylvia Bernstein, civil rights activist
Selma Munter Borchardt (1895– 1968), educator, lawyer, labor leader and lobbyist
William G. Draper, US Air Force pilot
George Dantzig, mathematician
Pat Foote, U.S. Army brigadier general
Charles D. Griffin, Navy admiral
Herbert Haft, founder of Dart Drug and Crown Books discount chains
J. Edgar Hoover, FBI director
Yvonne Levy Kushner, actress
Robert B. Luckey, Marine Corps general
Bruce Magruder (1903), U.S. Army major general
John S. McCain Jr., Navy admiral
John F. O'Leary, U.S. government official
Lansdale Sasscer, U.S. Congressman
John F. Shafroth Jr., U.S. Navy vice admiral
Alfred Sao-ke Sze, Chinese politician and diplomat
Oliver Lyman Spaulding (1891), U.S. Army brigadier general
Karl Truesdell, U.S. Army major general
Arthur Cutts Willard, engineer and university president
Eben Eveleth Winslow, U.S. Army brigadier general
Cardozo Senior High
H. R. Crawford (1957), politician
Marvin Gaye, musician
Petey Green, radio host
Moochie Norris, basketball player
James E. Mayo, museum director
Conrad Tillard (born 1964), politician, Baptist minister, radio host, author, and activist
Maury Wills, baseball player

Feeder patterns

The following elementary schools feed into Cardozo:
 Marie Reed Elementary School
 Cleveland Elementary School
 Garrison Elementary School
 Raymond Education Campus
 School Without Walls @ Francis-Stevens
 Seaton Elementary School
 Ross Elementary School

The following middle schools feed into Cardozo:

 Raymond Education Campus
 School Without Walls at Francis-Stevens

References

External links 

 

1928 establishments in Washington, D.C.
Columbia Heights, Washington, D.C.
Educational institutions established in 1928
Gothic Revival architecture in Washington, D.C.
Public high schools in Washington, D.C.
School buildings on the National Register of Historic Places in Washington, D.C.
William B. Ittner buildings
African-American history of Washington, D.C.
District of Columbia Public Schools